Five referendums were held in Liechtenstein during 1992. The first was held on 15 March on whether referendums should be introduced to approve international treaties, and was approved by 71.4% of voters. The second on 28 June concerned lowering the voting age from 20 to 18, but was rejected by 56.3% of voters. Two were held on 8 November on abolishing the 8% electoral threshold and adding a clause to the constitution banning discrimination, both of which were rejected. The fifth and final referendum on 13 December was on joining the European Economic Area. It was approved by 55.8% of voters, with a voter turnout of 87%.

Despite the vote in favour, when the EEA subsequently came into existence in 1994, Liechtenstein did not join until after a second referendum in 1995.

Results

Treaty referendum

Lowering the voting age from 20 to 18

Abolishment of the 8% electoral threshold

Amendment of the constitution to ban discrimination

Joining the European Economic Area

References

1992 referendums
1992 in Liechtenstein
Referendums in Liechtenstein
Suffrage referendums